Max Leopold Margolis (born in Meretz (Merkinė), Vilna Governorate, October 15, 1866 – April 2, 1932 in Philadelphia) was a Lithuanian Jewish and American philologist. Son of Isaac Margolis; educated at the elementary school of his native town, the Leibniz gymnasium, Berlin, and Columbia University, New York City (Ph.D. 1891). In 1891 he was appointed to a fellowship in Semitic languages at Columbia University, and from 1892 to 1897 he was instructor, and later assistant professor, of Hebrew language and Biblical exegesis at the Hebrew Union College of Cincinnati. In 1897 he became assistant professor of Semitic languages in the University of California; in 1898, associate professor; and from 1902 the head of the Semitic department. When Dropsie College was formed in 1909, Margolis was chosen as Professor of Biblical Philology, remaining at Dropsie College until his death in 1932.

Margolis was named editor-in-chief of the Jewish Publication Society's translation of the Bible into English, the finished product being published in 1917. He served as president of the Society of Biblical Literature as editor of the Journal of Biblical Literature (1914–1921). He was also editor of the Journal of the American Oriental Society.

Works (selected)
 "The Columbia College MS. of Megilla", New York, 1892
 "Notes on Semitic Grammar", parts i.-iii., in "Hebraica" ("American Journal of Semitic Languages and Literatures"), 1894, 1896, 1902
 "The Theology of the Old Prayer-Book", in "Year Book of the Central Conference of American Rabbis", 1897
 "The Theological Aspect of Reformed Judaism", Baltimore, 1904
 A History of the Jewish People, Philadelphia: Jewish Publication Society of America, 1927. (with Alexander Marx)

References
 
 Max Leopold Margolis: Scholar and Teacher. 1952. Philadelphia: Alumni Association, Dropsie College.
 Leonard Jay Greenspoon, Max Leopold Margolis: A Scholar's Scholar, Scholars Press, 1987

External links 
 ARC MS6 – Max Leopold Margolis Collection at www.library.upenn.edu

1866 births
1932 deaths
19th-century American people
19th-century Jewish biblical scholars
19th-century Lithuanian people
American biblical scholars
American people of Lithuanian-Jewish descent
American philologists
American translators
Columbia University alumni
Columbia University faculty
Dropsie College faculty
Hebrew language
Hebrew Union College – Jewish Institute of Religion faculty
Emigrants from the Russian Empire to the United States
Philologists from the Russian Empire
Jewish American writers
Jewish translators of the Bible
Judaic scholars
Lithuanian Jews
Writers from Vilnius
University of California, Berkeley faculty
Translators of the Bible into English
20th-century Jewish biblical scholars